The 2013–14 Jacksonville State Gamecocks men's basketball team represented Jacksonville State University during the 2013–14 NCAA Division I men's basketball season. The Gamecocks, led by sixth year head coach James Green, played their home games at the Pete Mathews Coliseum and were members of the East Division of the Ohio Valley Conference. They finished the season 10–21, 4–12 in OVC play to finish in a tie for fifth place in the East Division. They failed to qualify for the Ohio Valley Tournament. in 2017 the Jacksonville Gamecocks also made their first ever NCAA Tournament

Roster

Schedule

|-
!colspan=9 style="background:#FF0000; color:#000000;"| Exhibition

|-
!colspan=9 style="background:#FF0000; color:#000000;"| Regular Season

References

Jacksonville State Gamecocks men's basketball seasons
Jacksonville State
Jacksonville State Gamecocks Men's Basketball
Jacksonville State Gamecocks Men's Basketball